Garritsen is a Dutch patronymic surname. Notable people with the name include:

 Margaret Garritsen de Vries née Margaret Garritsen (1922–2009), American economist
 Martin Garrix (birth name Martijn Garritsen; born 1996), Dutch DJ, record producer and musician
 Nel Garritsen (1933–2014), Dutch swimmer

See also
Gerritsen

Dutch-language surnames
Patronymic surnames
Surnames from given names